Damaitphang Lyngdoh  (born 7 October 2003) is an Indian footballer who currently plays as a midfielder for Bengaluru in the Indian Super League.

Youth

Meghalaya State Team
Damaitphang and his friends made their way to the trails for Meghalaya state football team, much to his surprise the then 14-year-old got selected to represent his state in the sub-junior nationals which were being held in Kerala.

Bengaluru FC U-15, U-18 and B team
During the sub-junior national tournament of 2017, Damaitphang was caught by the eyes of then Bengaluru FC U-15 team's African head coach Suker (Abu Buker Sadiq) from Ghana, Africa and By the Head of Youth Development John kila . His goals tallied at 9, putting him among the joint top six scorers of the Junior League. As the season progressed, he kept on attracting more eyes and later was to promoted to the U-18 team and then to the B team.

Career

Bengaluru FC
It was in March 2021 when the 17-year-old did enough in the B team to impress the new coach at helm, Marco Pezzaiuoli. He was soon asked to train with the senior team before being handed a ticket to Goa, as part of the squad for the 2021 AFC Cup campaign.

Damaitphang made his debut for the club on 14 April 2021 after he came as a substitute on 71st minute of the game against Tribhuvan Army, and became the youngest player to represent senior team of Bengaluru FC at the age of 17 years 190 days.

Personal life
The third of four sons, Damaitphang hails from Umlyngka, a tiny village in the East Khasi Hills of Meghalaya. His mother works a government job, while his father operates a taxi in the village. On days that went long, young Lyngdoh made his way to the only nine-a-side ground in his locality.

References

2003 births
Living people
People from East Khasi Hills district
People from Meghalaya
Indian footballers
Bengaluru FC players
Association football midfielders
Footballers from Meghalaya
India youth international footballers